Barton Sutter is a Duluth, Minnesota-based writer of poetry and prose. His work reflects his love of the north country.

Early life
Barton Sutter is a Lutheran preacher's son and was raised in a large rural family. He received a B.A. in language arts from Southwest State University in 1972 and an M.A. in creative writing from Syracuse University in 1975. He moved to Duluth, Minnesota in the 1980s, where he continued publishing and also began work as an English instructor at the University of Minnesota Duluth. He then spent a number of years as a senior lecturer of English at the University of Wisconsin-Superior, retiring from that position in 2010. He occasionally appears as half of the artistic duo "The Sutter Brothers" with his brother, Ross Sutter, a folk musician. Sutter lives in Duluth with his wife and two daughters.

Career
Sutter was an essayist for the "Voices from the Heartland" series on Minnesota Public Radio from 1991 to 1997. He has published poems, stories, and essays in such publications as The North American Review, Poetry, Live Music, Minneapolis Star Tribune, and Minnesota Monthly.

Sutter is the only author to win the Minnesota Book Award in three separate categories: in fiction for My Father's War and Other Stories, in creative non-fiction for Cold Comfort, and in poetry with The Book of Names: New and Selected Poems. Sutter was also appointed Poet Laureate of Duluth, the first in Duluth history. He was unanimously chosen for the position by a committee set up by the Lake Superior Writers.

Works
 Cedarhome (1977)
 Pine Creek Parish Hall and Other Poems (1985)
 My Father's War and Other Stories (1991)
 The Book of Names: New and Selected Poems (1993)
 Cold Comfort: Life on the Top of the Map (1998)

 Farewell to the Starlight in Whiskey (2004)
 Chester Creek Ravine: Haiku (2015)

Awards 
 Bassine Citation from the Academy of American Poets, 1986
 Loft McKnight Award in Poetry, 1987
 Minnesota Book Award for Fiction, 1992
 Minnesota Book Award for Poetry, 1994
 Northeastern Minnesota Book Award, 1999
 Minnesota Book Award for Creative Non-Fiction, 1999
 George Morrison Artist Award, 2005
 Duluth Poet Laureate, 2006

References

External links 

Barton Sutter introduces authors Jon Hassler and Bill Holm at A Special Duluth Get-together honoring their two Afton Historical Society winter books, Underground Christmas and Faces of Christmas Past, respectively, with readings, book talk and music, Northern Lights TV Series #416 (1998)
 Barton Sutter is interviewed by writer Joe Muldoon about his book of essays Cold Comfort, and is featured reading his works with musical accompaniment by his brother Ross Sutter, Northern Lights TV Series #421 (1999):  https://reflections.mndigital.org/catalog/p16022coll38:105#/kaltura_video
Barton Sutter is featured on A Tribute to Minnesota Poet John Engman, Northern Lights TV Series #428 (1999):  https://reflections.mndigital.org/catalog/p16022coll38:107#/kaltura_video
Barton Sutter is featured on the 1999 Minnesota Book Awards Author Readings, Northern Lights TV Series #432 (1999):  https://reflections.mndigital.org/catalog/p16022coll38:208#/kaltura_video

Writers from Duluth, Minnesota
American male poets
Year of birth missing (living people)
Living people
Syracuse University alumni